Shariq (Persian: شريق‎‎) is a village in Iran. 

Shariq, Shareek, Sharique may also refer to:

Shariq (name)
Shareek, a 2015 Punjabi musical drama film 
Shareek-e-Hayat, a Pakistani TV series

See also
Sharik (disambiguation)